Daniel Batman (20 March 1981 – 26 June 2012) was an Australian sprinter. He was the Australian national men's 200-metres champion in 2005 and 2008. He competed in the 2000 Summer Olympics and his best international achievement was a sixth place at the 2003 World Indoor Championships.

Batman was born in Melbourne, Victoria.  He attended The Scots College and Cranbrook School. He claimed to be a direct descendant of John Batman, the founder of Melbourne  but John Batman's only son, John Charles Batman, died aged just 8 years old, reportedly by drowning in the Yarra River, but rumoured to have died of syphilis which his father carried.

Personal life
Batman was married to Nova Peris, an Olympic and Commonwealth Games gold medallist, in March 2002 but they separated in 2010. He had two children with Peris, Destiny and Jack. Batman had a child, Liberty, in late 2011 with partner Natalie Sainsbury.

On 26 June 2012, Batman was killed in a car crash at Marrakai, southeast of Darwin, Northern Territory. He was 31.

References

External links
 
 
 
 
 
 
 
 ABC story on Batman's death

1981 births
2012 deaths
Australian male sprinters
Olympic athletes of Australia
Athletes (track and field) at the 2000 Summer Olympics
Athletes (track and field) at the 2006 Commonwealth Games
Athletes from Melbourne
Australian Institute of Sport track and field athletes
Road incident deaths in the Northern Territory
People educated at Scots College (Sydney)
Australian people of English descent
People educated at Cranbrook School, Sydney
Commonwealth Games competitors for Australia